Sparrow Maurice "Mo" Hurt, Jr. (born September 8, 1987) is a former American football guard and offensive tackle that played in the National Football League (NFL).  He played college football for the University of Florida, and was a member of two BCS National Championship teams.  He was drafted by the Washington Redskins in the seventh round of the 2011 NFL Draft.

Early years
Hurt was born in Milledgeville, Georgia, and named for his father, Sparrow Maurice Hurt.  He attended Baldwin High School in Milledgeville, and played high school football for the Baldwin Braves.

College career
Hurt accepted an athletic scholarship to attend the University of Florida, where he played for coach Urban Meyer's Florida Gators football team from 2006 to 2010.  He played in three games as a true freshman in 2006, but was subsequently redshirted by his coaches.  As a redshirt sophomore in 2008, he was a member of the Gators' SEC Championship team, and played in the 2009 BCS Championship Game in which the Gators defeated the Oklahoma Sooners 24–14.

Professional career

Washington Redskins

2011 season
Hurt was drafted in the 2011 NFL Draft by the Washington Redskins. He was waived on September 3, 2011, but signed to the practice squad on September 4, 2011.
On October 19, 2011, Hurt was signed to the active roster. In Week 9 against San Francisco 49ers, Hurt made his NFL debut and first career start as left guard of the offensive line.
Hurt continued to start as the left guard for the rest of the season replacing Kory Lictensteiger, who was out for the season due to tearing his ACL.

2012 season
During the 2012 offseason, Hurt stated that he was getting practice reps at the tackle position. During training camp, he split snaps at left guard with Josh LeRibeus after Kory Lichtensteiger had arthroscopic surgery and split snaps at right tackle with Tyler Polumbus and Willie Smith after Jammal Brown was placed on the physically unable to perform (PUP) list. After playing as a reserve guard for most of the season, Hurt started at right tackle in Week 16 against the Philadelphia Eagles for Tyler Polumbus, who suffered a concussion in the previous game.

2013 season
Hurt was placed on the Redskins PUP list on August 31 to allow him to recover from arthroscopic knee surgery, meaning he would miss at least the first six games of the 2013 season. The team moved him from the PUP list to injured reserve on December 4, 2013.

2014 season
The Redskins waived him on August 30, 2014 for final roster cuts before the start of the 2014 season.

See also

 2000 Florida Gators football team
 List of Florida Gators in the NFL Draft
 List of Washington Redskins players

References

External links
  Maurice Hurt – Florida Gators player profile
  Maurice Hurt – Washington Redskins player profile

1987 births
Living people
People from Milledgeville, Georgia
Players of American football from Georgia (U.S. state)
American football offensive guards
American football offensive tackles
Florida Gators football players
Washington Redskins players